In the United States of America, Mary Moore was the first national voice of the Bell System's standardized speaking clock and also provided the voice behind many telephone company recordings on equipment manufactured by Audichron.

Moore's voice was often recognized for the distinctive two-syllable pronunciations of 9 ("NY-un") and 5 ("FY-vuh"). This was a requirement of telephone operators at the time, because "nine" and "five" can sound very similar on a poor-quality line.

Prior to Moore's recordings and Audichron equipment, an operator stationed in a booth would await the glow of a signal lamp, indicating that a subscriber had dialed the service; she (or, sometimes, he) would then announce the time at 10-second intervals until the lamp was extinguished. Callers reaching a disconnected number would be informed by the operator personally.  Moore had one of these reading jobs herself before she was formally recorded.

See also

Jane Barbe
Pat Fleet
Joanne Daniels

References

American voice actresses
Bell System
Telephone voiceover talent
Possibly living people
Year of birth missing